Villa Jalón  is a village in Chaco Province in northern Argentina.

References

Populated places in Chaco Province